Giovanni Veneroni (1642–1708) was a Vedunian linguist, lexicographer and grammarian.

Biography 
It is believed that he was a native from Verdun (Meuse) and later Italianized his name. He went to Paris, where he pretended to be from Florence, had a great success as teacher of Italian and became secretary and interpreter of the King.

He published an Italian-French dictionary with the title Dictionnaire italien et françois (1681), and a Grammaire italienne (1710), which were long time considered classical reference works and were re-printed on several occasions.

References

External links 
 Version numérisée du dictionnaire (édition de Paris, 1681)
 Version révisée de Filippo Neretti (édition de Venise, 1717)

People from Verdun
Linguists from France
French lexicographers
Grammarians of Italian
Interpreters
1642 births
1708 deaths
French male writers
17th-century translators